"My Mother Was Never a Kid" is a 1981 episode of the American television anthology series ABC Afterschool Special, which aired on March 16, 1981. It was based on the 1977 Francine Pascal novel Hangin' Out With CiCi, which in turn was the first teen novel in the "Victoria Martin" trilogy series. It was also the first of two Pascal teen novels that were adapted into Afterschool Specials for the network, the other being The Hand-Me-Down Kid.

Premise
The story revolved around Victoria Martin, a 14-year-old New Yorker whose attempts to be part of the current generation has gotten her into trouble at school (smoking in the girls' bathroom is cited as an example). When her mother Felicia finds out what happened and decides to ground her, Victoria argues with her and leaves the apartment, and takes a trip in the subway to meet her friend. During the ride, Victoria kept thinking about how her mother could not understand how she can relate to what she is going through and wonders if her mother was never a kid... until an accidental slam on the subway car brake causes Victoria to fall on the floor.

When Victoria comes to a few seconds later, she starts noticing something different: The subway car is clean and has no graffiti, people are dressed differently and when she gets off the train she is shocked that her neighborhood is nothing like the present day...it's 1944. As she tries to figure out what happened, she runs into another 14-year-old teen named CiCi, with whom she becomes fast friends. Victoria also discovers that she and CiCi seem to have a lot in common, only to discover that after CiCi invites her to stay at her house that CiCi's mother is Victoria's grandmother - and CiCi is the nickname of Felicia, who will be her mother in the future.  This sudden surprise of fate gives Victoria a chance to learn a lot about her mother's past and at the same time learn about her own, which she will discover as she returns to the present day.

Reception and legacy
The program was nominated for five Daytime Emmy Awards in 1981, taking home two for "Outstanding Individual Achievement in Children's Programming - Art Direction/Scenic Design/Set Decoration" and "Outstanding Individual Achievement in Children's Programming - Makeup and Hair Design."

The episode was also spoofed by RiffTrax, this time featuring Mary Jo Pehl and Bridget Nelson, on May, 12 2019.

Cast
 Mary Beth Manning as Victoria Martin
 Holland Taylor as Felicia Martin
 Rachael Longaker as CiCi
 Jane Lowry as Esther Drew
 Elizabeth Ward as Nina Martin

References

External links
 
 RiffTrax treatment on official YouTube channel

1981 American television episodes
ABC Afterschool Special episodes
Television episodes based on works
Television episodes about time travel
Television episodes set in the 1940s